Superoxide reductase is an enzyme that catalyzes the conversion of highly reactive and toxic superoxide (O2−) into less toxic hydrogen peroxide (H2O2):

reduced rubredoxin + O2− + 2 H+  rubredoxin + H2O2
Fe2+ + O2− + 2 H+  Fe3++ H2O2

Hydrogen peroxide in turn is reduced to water by rubrerythrin. The 3 substrates of this enzyme are reduced rubredoxin, superoxide, and H+, whereas its two products are rubredoxin and H2O2.

This enzyme belongs to the family of oxidoreductases, specifically those acting on superoxide as acceptor (only sub-subclass identified to date).  The systematic name of this enzyme class is rubredoxin:superoxide oxidoreductase. Other names in common use include neelaredoxin, and desulfoferrodoxin.

Structural studies

References

Further reading 

 
 
 
 

EC 1.15.1
Enzymes of known structure